Patricia Mary "Trish" Johnson (born 17 January 1966) is an English professional golfer.

Early life and amateur career
Johnson was born in Bristol. Her three brothers were all golfers, one of them was a professional golfer. She practiced other sports, like badminton, soccer and tennis. She preferred to not take golf lessons and learn by herself.

She was South Western Champion in 1983 and 1984. In 1984 she was both England Under-23 and Under-21 Champion. In 1985 she won the English Women's Amateur Championship, was the English Women's Strokeplay Champion and repeated as England Under-23 Champion. In 1986 she represented GB & I in the Espirito Santo Trophy World Amateur Golf Team Championships and the Curtis Cup, where she won maximum points.

Professional career
Johnson turned professional in March 1987. She won three tournaments in her first year as a professional and was Rookie of Year on the Ladies European Tour in 1987. She won four tournaments in 1990 and won the 1990 Order of Merit. Overall, she has won 18 tournaments on the Ladies European Tour and has finished in the top ten of the Order of Merit on thirteen occasions, including second places in 2000 and 2004 when she won the 2004 Wales "Golf as it should be" Ladies Open. Her latest victory came at the 2007 BMW Ladies Italian Open.

Johnson won the 1987 LPGA Tour Qualifying School to earn playing rights for the 1988 season. She has three wins on the US-based LPGATour. She won the 1993 Las Vegas LPGA tournament and the following week's LPGA Atlanta Women's Championship. Her last LPGA victory was the 1996 Fieldcrest Cannon Classic.

She was a member of the European Solheim Cup team in 1990, 1992, 1994, 1996, 1998, 2000, 2005, and 2007 and teamed with Laura Davies to represent England at the 2007 Women's World Cup of Golf.

Senior career
Johnson has won four tournaments in the Legends Tour, including the inaugural Senior LPGA Championship in 2017.

Professional wins (28)

Ladies European Tour wins (19)
1987 (3) McEwan's Wirral Classic, Bloor Homes Eastleigh Classic, Woolmark Ladies' Matchplay
1990 (4) Longines Classic, Hennessy Ladies' Cup, Bloor Homes Eastleigh Classic, Ladies European Open
1992 (1) Skol La Manga Club Classic
1996 (2) Marks & Spencer European Open, Open de France Dames
1999 (2) Open de France Dames, Marrakech Open
2000 (1) The Daily Telegraph Ladies British Masters
2004 (1) Wales "Golf as it should be" Ladies Open
2007 (1) BMW Ladies Italian Open
2008 (1) VCI European Ladies Golf Cup (with Rebecca Hudson)
2010 (2) Tenerife Ladies Open, Open de France Feminin
2014 (1) Aberdeen Asset Management Ladies Scottish Open

LPGA Tour wins (3)

Other wins (1)
this list may be incomplete
1992 Sunrise Cup World Team Championship (individual)

Legends Tour wins (5)
2016 The Legends Championship
2017 Senior LPGA Championship
2018 Suquamish Clearwater Legends Cup, BJ's Charity Championship (with Laura Davies)
2021 Senior LPGA Championship

Ladies European Tour career summary

Yellow for top-10 finishes, green for first.

Team appearances
Amateur
European Lady Junior's Team Championship (representing England): 1984, 1986 (winners)
Vagliano Trophy (representing Great Britain & Ireland): 1985 (winners)
European Ladies' Team Championship (representing England): 1985
Curtis Cup (representing Great Britain & Ireland): 1986 (winners)
Espirito Santo Trophy: (representing Great Britain & Ireland): 1986

Professional
Solheim Cup (representing Europe): 1990, 1992 (winners), 1994, 1996, 1998, 2000 (winners), 2005, 2007
World Cup (representing England): 2007, 2008
Handa Cup (representing World team): 2013 (winners), 2014, 2015
The Queens (representing Europe): 2016

Solheim Cup record

See also
List of golfers with most Ladies European Tour wins

Notes and references

External links

English female golfers
Ladies European Tour golfers
LPGA Tour golfers
Solheim Cup competitors for Europe
Sportspeople from Bristol
1966 births
Living people